Amami (literally Love me, also known as Daddy Don't Blush) is a 1993 Italian comedy film directed by Bruno Colella.

Plot 
Tullio Venturini, a retired widower, has a daughter, Anna, who is an actress. However, he is the only one not to know that she works in the industry of porn. When he turns out the truth goes in full crisis. The daughter will be able to rebuild her relationship with him as to make him participate in a biopic about her career as a hard diva.

Cast 
Moana Pozzi as Anna Venturini
Novello Novelli as Tullio Venturini
 as Mary
Tony Esposito as Marco
Flavio Bucci as Pagani 
Bruno Colella  
Victor Cavallo 
Eugenio Bennato 
Carlo Buccirosso
Carlo Monni 
Jeff Blynn 
Massimo Ceccherini

See also     
 List of Italian films of 1993

References

External links

1993 films
Italian comedy films
1993 comedy films
Films about pornography
1993 directorial debut films
1990s Italian-language films
1990s Italian films